TYKA is an Indian sportswear and sports equipment brand introduced by TK Sports Private Limited in 2009. Primarily being the kit partner for various cricket teams across the world, TYKA is now associated with various football teams.

The company was incorporated on March 18, 2011. TYKA entered the market in 2014 when they were announced as the sports manufacture sponsor of Indian Super League side, Chennaiyin FC. TYKA have also made their way into the cricket market, being the official apparel sponsor of Indian Premier League sides Sunrisers Hyderabad. TYKA also sponsors the United Arab Emirates national cricket team.

Teams

Cricket

International 

 Afghanistan National Cricket Team
 United Arab Emirates National Cricket Team

Domestic Clubs

Caribbean Premier League

  Guyana Amazon Warriors
  St Kitts and Nevis Patriots

Hong Kong T20 Blitz

  Galaxy Gladiators Lantau

Indian Premier League

  Sunrisers Hyderabad

Karnataka Premier League

  Mysuru Warriors 
   Shivamogga Lions  
  Bijapur Bulls

Tamil Nadu Premier League

  Chepauk Super Gillies 
  Siechem Madurai Panthers

T20 Mumbai League

  ARCH Andheri 
  North Mumbai Panthers

Celebrity Cricket League

   Bengal Tigers

English Cricket County

  Somerset County Cricket Club
  Werrington Cricket Club
  Bexleyheath Cricket Club
  Western Storm

Clubs in Scotland

  Galloway C. C.

Cricket clubs in America

  Atlantic Eagles Cricket Club
  AGCC
  Atlantic Paramveers
  Bay Area Cricket Alliance
  Bazooka Cricket
  Delaware Blue Hens Cricket Club
  Cardinal Hollywood C. C.
  Corinthian C. C.
  Crescent C. C.
  Intermountain Cricket League (Utah)
  Inland Empire C. C.
  Jersey Knights Cricket Club (New Jersey)
  Lehigh Valley C. C.
  North California Cricket Association
  Stanford University Cricket Club
  Santa Clara C. C.
  Utah All Star C. C.

Clubs in Australia

  Ashburton Willows C. C.
  Ascot Eagle Junior C. C.
  Bulls University C. C.
  Caulfield C. C.
  Donnybrook C. C.
  Hills Rangers F. C.
  De La Salle F. C.
  Kew C. C.
  Parkdale C. C.
  Shane Warne Foundation 
  WGCC

Indian domestic associations

  Bihar Cricket Association
  Chhattisgarh State Cricket Sangh
  Cricket Association of Bengal 
  Goa Cricket Association
  Kerala Cricket Association 
  Madhya Pradesh Cricket Association 
  National Cricket Academy
  Odisha Cricket Association
  Sports Authority of India
  Vidarbha Cricket Association

Indian corporates and government organizations

  Indian Air Force
  Indian Audit and Accounts Service
  ONGC
  Punjab National Bank
  Reliance Industries

Indian universities and schools

  BITS Pilani
  IIT Bombay
  Kasiga School
  Kodaikanal International School
  Mangalore Institute of Technology And Engineering 
  Modern School (New Delhi)
  NMIMS Shirpur
  PES University
  Punjabi University
  Welham Boys' School

Football

Clubs
  SC East Bengal (2020)
  Delhi Dynamos FC (2018–2019)
  Odisha FC (2019—2020)
  Chennaiyin FC (2014–2015) 
  Indian Super League - referee and crew clothing in 2015 season
  U Dream Football by Unilazer Sports (Ronnie Screwvala)

Kabaddi

Clubs
  Bengal Warriors (2014–)
  Dabang Delhi (2014–) 
  Jaipur Pink Panthers (2014–2015)
  U Mumba (2014–2015)

Shooting
  Indian National Shooting Team

Squash
  Squash Rackets Federation of India

References

Companies based in Punjab, India
Sportswear brands
Indian companies established in 2014
Sporting goods manufacturers of India
Indian brands
2009 establishments in Punjab, India